Yves Christen (born 13 July 1941 in Bern, Switzerland) is a Swiss politician who served as President of the National Council from 6 November 2002 to 1 November 2003.

Christen studied at ETH Zurich and obtained a diploma in civil engineering. He was first elected to the National Council in 1995, serving until 2006.

Christen is married and has two children. A judo practitioner, he was the champion in the under 63 kg category at the 1968 Swiss Championship in Fribourg.

References

1941 births
Living people
Members of the National Council (Switzerland)
Presidents of the National Council (Switzerland)